The 2009 Greek Cup Final, dubbed the Greatest Final by Greek media and fans, was the 65th final of the Greek Cup. The match took place on 2 May 2009 at Olympic Stadium. The contesting teams were AEK Athens and Olympiacos. It was AEK Athens' nineteenth Greek Cup Final in their 85-year history and Olympiacos' thirty fourth Greek Cup Final and second consecutive in their 84 years of existence. It was the last match for Olympiacos' captain, Predrag Đorđević as a footballer, having spent 13 years of his 17 years playing for the club. Golden sub Matt Derbyshire was named Man of the Match after having scored two goals in the final, including a last-second equaliser at the 96th minute.

With 8 goals at normal and extra time, 34 penalties taken and 3 red cards, it is considered one of the best finals in association football history, having received critical acclaim for its extreme suspense, passion, goals and breathtaking moments between players and is widely considered as the best match to have ever commenced in Greek football.

Venue

This was the sixteenth Greek Cup Final held at the Athens Olympic Stadium, after the 1983, 1984, 1985, 1986, 1987, 1988, 1989, 1990, 1993, 1994, 1995, 1996, 1999, 2000 and 2002 finals.

The Athens Olympic Stadium was built in 1982 and renovated once in 2004. The stadium is used as a venue for AEK Athens and Panathinaikos and was used for Olympiacos and Greece in various occasions. Its current capacity is 69,618 and hosted 3 UEFA European Cup/Champions League Finals in 1983, 1994 and 2007, a UEFA Cup Winners' Cup Final in 1987, the 1991 Mediterranean Games and the 2004 Summer Olympics.

Background
AEK Athens qualified for the Greek Cup Final eighteen times, winning eleven of them. They last won the Cup in 2002 defeating Olympiacos, 2–1. They last qualified for a Final in 2006. They had lost to Olympiacos, 3–0.

Olympiacos qualified for the Greek Cup Final thirty three times, winning twenty three of them. They last played in a Final in 2008 defeating Aris, 2–0.

Route to the final

Match

Details

See also
2008–09 Greek Football Cup

References

2009
Cup Final
Greek Cup Final 2009
Greek Cup Final 2009
Greek Cup Final 2009
Sports competitions in Athens
May 2009 sports events in Europe